Adalvard the Younger (dead before 1072) was a German missionary bishop from Bremen who was active in Sigtuna, in Sweden, in the 1060s. According to Adam of Bremen, Adalvard tried to make the Swedish king Stenkil close the great temple at Uppsala. This attempt failed and so Adalvard had to flee to Västergötland, where he could succeed his namesake Adalvard the Elder in Skara. Adalvard later returned to Bremen where he stayed in June 1069. Adam of Bremen cites Adalvard as his source concerning Swedish matters.

Literature

11th-century bishops in Sweden
11th-century deaths
Year of birth unknown
11th-century German clergy